Njan Kodiswaran is a 1994 Indian Malayalam-language film, directed by Jose Thomas. The film stars Jagadish, Innocent, Sudheesh, Baiju, Rajan P. Dev, Kuthiravattom Pappu, Oduvil Unnikrishnan, M. S. Thrippunnithra, Jose Pallissery, Vinodhini, Akshara, Nina Kurup, Kaviyoor Ponnamma, Zeenath, Aranmula Ponnamma, etc. The film has musical score by Ouseppachan.

Cast
 
Jagadish... Gopi
Vinodini... Maya
Innocent... Appunni Nair
Kaviyoor Ponnamma... Janaki
Mahesh... Vijayan
Rajan P. Dev... Mathachen
Aranmula Ponnamma... Grandmother
Bobby Kottarakkara... Astrologer Krishna Panicker 
Jose Pellissery... Bank manager Venugopala Pothuval
Kuthiravattam Pappu... Menon
M. S. Thripunithura... Panattu Govindan Nair
Neena Kurup... Indhu
Oduvil Unnikrishnan... Panattu Sankaran Nair 
Sudheesh... Hari 
Baiju... Sunny

Soundtrack
The music was composed by Ouseppachan.

References

External links
  
 

1994 films
1990s Malayalam-language films
Films based on Malayalam novels
Films directed by Jose Thomas
Films scored by Ouseppachan